Mammillaria elongata, the gold lace cactus or ladyfinger cactus, is a species of flowering plant in the family Cactaceae, native to central Mexico. It is among the most common and most variable of its genus in nature, and is a popular subject for cultivation. It has gained the Royal Horticultural Society's Award of Garden Merit.

Description
The cactus forms dense groups of cylindrical, erect or semi-prostrate stems about 6 to 15 cm long and 1.5 to 3.7 cm in diameter. Its body, bright green, is formed by short conical tubercles (2 to 4 mm) ending in round and woolly areoles in the young segments, unlike tubercular axils that lack wooliness. It has between 15 and 30 short radial spines (6 to 12 mm), curved outwards that intersect with those of the nearby areoles and 1 to 3 central (sometimes absent) yellow or golden color. The flowers arise on the upper part of the stems, with pale yellow or white toothed petals, sometimes with a darker or reddish central line 1.5 cm in length and diameter. The fruits are cylindrical to globose, brown or red, with a large number of seeds. Blooms profusely between late winter and early summer.

Cultivars 
 Golden Stars
 "Copper King"
 "Cristata" (Brain Cactus)
 "Julio"

References 

 Maria Papafotiou, George N. Balotis, Panayiota T. Louka and John Chronopoulos, (2004) In vitro plant regeneration of Mammillaria elongata normal and cristate forms, Volume 65, Number 2.

External links

elongata
Cacti of Mexico
Endemic flora of Mexico
Flora of Central Mexico